The Polskava is a river in Styria, Slovenia. Its source is on the Pohorje Massif, near Saint Henry's Church at the Maribor Pohorje Ski Resort. It passes Šmartno na Pohorju, Zgornja Polskava, Spodnja Polskava, Pragersko, and Lovrenc na Dravskem Polju, and merges with the Dravinja River near Videm pri Ptuju.

References

Rivers of Styria (Slovenia)